Johnstongunj is a neighborhood of Allahabad, Uttar Pradesh, India. It lies in the Old City of Allahabad near Chowk.

See also
 List of streets and roads in Allahabad

References

Neighbourhoods in Allahabad